Charles G. Stretch (born August 3, 1989) is an American professional ice hockey player who currently plays for SC Bietigheim Steelers of the Deutsche Eishockey Liga (DEL) in Germany.

Playing career
Undrafted, Stretch played major junior hockey with the Kamloops Blazers in the Western Hockey League. He made his professional debut at the tail end of the 2009–10 season, with the Ontario Reign in the ECHL where he was a fan favorite.

On January 24, 2013, Stretch was a starter for the 2012–13 ECHL All-Star Game and played as the elected captain of the All-Star team.

On September 19, 2014, it was announced Stretch would attend the Bridgeport Sound Tigers training camp after signing a one-year AHL contract. In the 2014–15 season, Stretch continued his scoring pace with 26 points in 47 games before he was traded in a return to the Oklahoma City Barons on February 25, 2015.

On August 7, 2015, Stretch opted to pursue a career abroad, agreeing to a one-year contract in the German second tier DEL2 with Starbulls Rosenheim.

References

External links

1989 births
American men's ice hockey centers
SC Bietigheim-Bissingen players
Bridgeport Sound Tigers players
Houston Aeros (1994–2013) players
Ice hockey players from California
Kamloops Blazers players
Living people
Löwen Frankfurt players
Oklahoma City Barons players
Ontario Reign (ECHL) players
Orli Znojmo players
Sportspeople from Irvine, California
Starbulls Rosenheim players
American expatriate ice hockey players in Canada
American expatriate ice hockey players in the Czech Republic
American expatriate ice hockey players in Hungary
American expatriate ice hockey players in Germany